Sir Robbie Paul Gibb (born September 1964) is a British public relations professional and former political advisor and broadcast journalist.

He is the brother of Conservative MP Nick Gibb. After graduating from Royal Holloway, University of London, he pursued a career as a journalist with his first role as a political researcher at the BBC. He then became chief of staff for Conservative MP Francis Maude in the late 1990s. Gibb returned to the BBC in 2002 as the deputy political editor of Newsnight and went on to edit various television programmes including Daily Politics, The Andrew Marr Show, and This Week. He was Prime Minister Theresa May's Downing Street Director of Communications between 2017 and 2019. Gibb then became a senior advisor for the public relations consultancy Kekst CNC. He joined the BBC Board as a non-executive director in 2021.

Early life and education
Gibb was raised in the West Yorkshire cities of Leeds and Wakefield. He studied Economics and Public Administration at Royal Holloway, University of London. In his youth, Gibb and his brother Nick were recruited and trained by the National Alliance of Russian Solidarists, a right-wing Russian anticommunist organisation.

Career
After graduation, Gibb joined the BBC as a political researcher including for the television programme On the Record. He left this role, soon after his brother Nick had been elected as Conservative MP for Bognor Regis and Littlehampton, to become Conservative MP and shadow chancellor Francis Maude's chief of staff. He served in this role till 2000. Gibb then joined Maude in supporting Michael Portillo's unsuccessful campaign to become leader in the 2001 Conservative Party leadership election.

He returned to the BBC in 2002 as deputy editor of the news and current affairs television programme Newsnight. Gibb left this role to become the organisation's political editor for various programmes including Daily Politics, The Andrew Marr Show, and This Week as well coverage of the Budget. He was also editor of live political events including The Great Debate during the 2016 EU referendum campaign. Gibb is a prominent supporter of Brexit.   

In 2017, Gibb returned to politics by becoming Conservative Prime Minister Theresa May's Downing Street Director of Communications. He was succeeded by Lee Cain after Boris Johnson became prime minister in 2019. He was appointed a Knight Bachelor in May's resignation honours on 10 September 2019 for political and public service. Gibb then became a senior advisor for global strategic communications consultancy Kekst CNC which is part of the French public relations firm Publicis Groupe.

In 2020, he led a successful consortium bid to buy The Jewish Chronicle. He was an editorial advisor for GB News prior to its launch in 2021. Gibb also advised the government in 2021 on the publication of the Commission on Race and Ethnic Disparities report. 

Gibb joined the BBC Board in May 2021 as the Member for England for a three-year term. He is known as a "right-of-centre voice" on the board. According to the Financial Times, he reportedly attempted to block Jess Brammar's appointment as BBC executive news editor in July 2021. He had allegedly sent a text message to Director, News & Current Affairs Fran Unsworth that urged her not to "make this appointment" as it would shatter the government's "fragile trust in the BBC". A source close to Gibb denied that he sent the message. Deputy Labour Party Leader Angela Rayner called for his resignation, saying it was "Tory cronyism at the heart of the BBC". In August 2022, former BBC presenter Emily Maitlis stated that Gibb was an "active agent of the Conservative party" who played a significant role in determining the nature of the corporation's news output.

Personal life
He is married to Liz and they have two daughters.

References

 

 
 

Living people
British political consultants
Conservative Party (UK) people
Knights Bachelor
British journalists
BBC newsreaders and journalists
1964 births
Place of birth missing (living people)
BBC Board members